Hratch Zadourian (born 25 March 1969) is a Lebanese former racing cyclist who competed at the 1988 Summer Olympics.

References

1969 births
Living people
Lebanese male cyclists
Olympic cyclists of Lebanon
Cyclists at the 1988 Summer Olympics
Place of birth missing (living people)